Telemach is the third largest mobile operator in Slovenia with over 600,000 customers.

History
The company was established in 2006. Tušmobil gained its mobile license when US-based Western Wireless International (Vega) shut down its network at the end of May 2006. In March 2007, Tušmobil selected Nokia as its GSM/EDGE core and radio network supplier. Tušmobil officially started operations on 31 October 2007. In 2008, it also acquired a UMTS license. Tušmobil commercially launched UMTS 900 in July 2010. The network was upgraded to support HSPA+ in November 2010. In the last quarter of 2014, Tušmobil had a market share of 13%. Telemach acquired 100% of Tušmobil in April 2015. Telemach commercially launched LTE in June 2015 and renovated the existing GSM/UMTS network with equipment from one of the largest telecom equipment vendors Huawei.

References

Mobile phone companies of Slovenia
Privately held companies of Slovenia
Telecommunications companies established in 2006
Companies based in Ljubljana
Slovenian brands
Cable television companies of Slovenia
2006 establishments in Slovenia
2007 mergers and acquisitions